Sheldon Lavin (born 1932) is an American billionaire businessman, and the owner, chief executive officer (CEO) and chairman of OSI Group, a US meat processor and the main hamburger supplier to McDonald's.

Early life
Sheldon Lavin was born in 1932. He earned a bachelor's degree in business from Roosevelt University in Chicago.

Career
In 1970, Lavin worked with OSI as a consultant to help the company organize the financing of its first modern meat plant. He later became a full-time employee, and took over the business in the 1980s, eventually acquiring an estimated 90% stake.

Personal life
Lavin lives in Highland Park, Illinois, US.

He was married to Sylvia Spatz for 55 years until her death in 2009. They had three children, Debbi Rosenberg, Steven H. Lavin, and Jerold R. Lavin, none of whom work at OSI. Lavin is Jewish.

Honours
In November 2013, Lavin was inducted into the Meat Industry Hall of Fame.

References

Living people
American billionaires
People from Highland Park, New Jersey
1930s births
Roosevelt University alumni
Jewish American philanthropists